Kimmirut Airport  is located at Kimmirut, Nunavut, Canada, and is operated by the Government of Nunavut. Unlike most airports in Nunavut, it uses magnetic headings for the runway rather than true headings.

At  the Kimmirut airstrip is the second shortest in Nunavut.

The length of the runway and challenging terrain at both Kimmirut and Grise Fiord limit the type of aircraft that can service those communities. Currently, both are served by airlines operating Twin Otter aircraft.

Airlines and destinations

References

Aeronautical Information Manual Transport Canada publication TP 14371E
Designated Airspace Handbook, Transport Canada

External links

Baffin Island
Certified airports in the Qikiqtaaluk Region